Ramse Mostoller was a costume designer known for her works on Dark Shadows and Ryan's Hope, Sesame Street, The Electric Company, and Another World. She also did costume designs for the film House of Dark Shadows in 1970. From 1968 onwards, she was credited as simply Mostoller.

Filmography as costumer
Ryan's Hope (760 episodes, 1975–1980)
House of Dark Shadows (1970)
Dark Shadows (1,093 episodes, 1966–1970)
Sesame Street (1969)
Dead of Night: A Darkness at Blaisedon (1969) (TV)
Santa Claus Conquers the Martians (1964)
Another World (1964)
The Doctors (1963)

Theatre
Venus Is (1966)
The Impossible Years (1967)
The Affair (1962)

References

External links

Living people
Year of birth missing (living people)
Costume designers